Andrew Weidinger (born July 10, 1982) is an American football coach who is the offensive coordinator for the Rhein Fire of the European League of Football (ELF).  Weidinger was the head coach for the Barcelona Dragons in 2022, leading the team to an 8-4 record and their first ever playoff appearance.  Weidinger was named the 2022 ELF Coach of the Year for his work with the Dragons.  He previously coached for the Atlanta Falcons and Tampa Bay Buccaneers of the National Football League, the Arizona Hotshots of the now extinct Alliance of American Football and The University of Arizona.

College coaching
Weidinger began his football and coaching career in 2000 when he enrolled at the University of Arizona. There he worked as a student assistant and later a graduate assistant on defense. At the end of his college career he was assistant director of football operations with a focus on recruiting and scouting.

NFL coaching

Atlanta Falcons
In 2006 Weidinger had a pre-season internship with the Atlanta Falcons where he assisted in scouting and evaluating of potential players throughout the NFL. 2008 he was hired as assistant to the head coach under Mike Smith. In the 2012 season he was promoted to offensive assistant. He stayed with the Falcons until 2014.

Tampa Bay Buccaneers
For the 2015 season Weidinger was hired by the Tampa Bay Buccaneers as an offensive quality control coach. There he reunited with former Falcons OC Dirk Koetter who was the OC and head coach for the Bucs. One year later he was promoted to assistant wide receivers coach and was assigned to game management. With a new head coach for the 2018 season, he left the franchise in 2018.

ELF coaching
After stints as a coach for the Arizona Hotshots and the Potsdam Royals he was announced as the head coach for the 2022 season of the Barcelona Dragons. The Barcelona Dragons reached the playoffs, where they were eliminated by the Vienna Vikings in the semifinals. On September 13, 2022, the team announced that they had parted ways.  Weidinger was announced as the Offensive Coordinator for the Rhein Fire on September 27, 2022.

Private life
He received a degree in political science in May 2004 and completed his master's degree in information resources and library sciences in May 2007.

External links
 University of Arizona Bio

References

1982 births
Living people
Tampa Bay Buccaneers coaches
Atlanta Falcons coaches
European League of Football coaches